Kiefer Sutherland is a British-Canadian actor who has starred or played prominent roles in various films and television series over the course of several decades, most notably Jack Bauer of the Fox drama series 24. He is also known for his voice roles in the Call of Duty and Metal Gear video game franchises.

Film

Television

Video games

References

External links
 

Male actor filmographies
British filmographies
Canadian filmographies